Pooja is a 1967 Indian Malayalam-language film, directed by P. Karamachandran and produced by P. Karamachandran. The film stars Prem Nazir, Sheela, Sukumari and T. S. Muthaiah. The film's score was composed by G. Devarajan.

Cast
Prem Nazir
Sheela
Sukumari
T. S. Muthaiah
Bahadoor
G. K. Pillai
Kottarakkara Sreedharan Nair
Panjabi
Prathapan
Vijayanirmala

Soundtrack
The music was composed by G. Devarajan with lyrics by P. Bhaskaran.

References

External links
 

1967 films
1960s Malayalam-language films